Coëtlogon can refer to:

 Alain Emmanuel de Coëtlogon, Marshal of France
 Marine de Carné de Trécesson de Coëtlogon, French diplomat
 Coëtlogon, Côtes-d'Armor, a French commune
 Coëtlogon, a French Navy frigate under the command of Abel-Nicolas Bergasse du Petit-Thouars during the Boshin war in Japan.